V-set domain-containing T-cell activation inhibitor 1 is a protein that in humans is encoded by the VTCN1 gene.

Function 

B7H4 belongs to the B7 family (see CD80; MIM 112203) of costimulatory proteins. These proteins are expressed on the surface of antigen-presenting cells and interact with ligands (e.g., CD28; MIM 186760) on T lymphocytes.[supplied by OMIM]

B7-H4 is an immune checkpoint molecule.

See also 
 B7 (protein)

References

Further reading